"Quiet Village" is an orchestral pop instrumental that was written and originally performed by Les Baxter in 1951 and an instrumental album from 1959 by Martin Denny. In the liner notes to his album, Ritual of the Savage (Le sacre du sauvage), Baxter described the themes he was conveying in the work:

Martin Denny version 
In the mid-1950s, Martin Denny and his band performed at a restaurant in Oahu, The Shell Bar, and frequently would play Baxter cover songs. One night, while his group was performing, Denny realized bullfrogs were croaking along to the music. As a joke, the band began incorporating frog sounds and birdcalls into the performance. Soon after, people began requesting "the song with the frogs." "They really enjoyed the frogs!" Denny observed. "And they thought we were making those croaking noises. So I understood that this was the way to go."

The squawks and jungle sounds in the Martin Denny version of "Quiet Village" were performed by A. Purves Pullen, also known as Dr. Horatio Q. Birdbath.

In 1957, Denny and his group released a cover of the song featuring exotic instruments and sounds that made it to number four on the pop singles chart on June 1, 1959 and number eleven on the R&B chart. Denny also recorded a stereo version of the song in 1959, a bossa nova version in 1964, and a version performed on a Moog synthesizer in 1969. He released an album with a similar title (Quiet Village, the Exotic Sounds of Martin Denny) in 1959.

Other cover versions 
In 1955, organist George Wright recorded an arrangement of the song on the former Chicago Paradise five-manual Wurlitzer theatre organ then installed in the home studio of Richard Vaughn.  The arrangement made use of real bird calls - actually a recording of a mockingbird slowed down to half-speed which was also used in at least one recording by Arthur Lyman.
In 1959, actress and singer Darla Hood recorded the first vocal version in the wake of the huge success that Martin Denny had with his instrumental version.  Released on Ray Note Records and credited to Darla Hood & Fabulous Modesto Orch, which was percussionist Modesto Duran's Orchestra.
In 1977, The Ritchie Family recorded a disco version and added vocals. The single was included on their African Queens album. Along with the album's title track and "Summer Dance", "Quiet Village" hit number one for three weeks on the disco/dance chart in 1977. However, unlike the Martin Denny version, The Ritchie Family recording did not chart on the pop singles chart. It did peak at #68 on the R&B singles chart. 

In 1986, composer Mark Mothersbaugh incorporated the song and animal sounds into the prelude theme for the children's television program  Pee-wee's Playhouse.
Influential noise artist Boyd Rice and writer/publisher Adam Parfrey released a comedic version of the song entitled "Quiet Village Idiot" under the moniker "The Tards" in 1993.
In 1991 Guitarist Danny Gatton recorded a version on the album "88 Elmira Street".  This version introduced Les Baxter and Martin Denny's music to a new generation of listeners/musicians.

References

1951 singles
1958 singles
1977 singles
The Ritchie Family songs
Exotica
1950s instrumentals
Pop instrumentals
Song recordings produced by Jacques Morali
1951 songs
Liberty Records singles